Bobbie Joe Williams, Jr. (born September 25, 1976) is a former American football guard. He was drafted by the Philadelphia Eagles in the second round of the 2000 NFL Draft. He played college football at Arkansas. Williams has also played for the Cincinnati Bengals and Baltimore Ravens.

Early years
Williams attended Jefferson High School in Jefferson, Texas, and was a letterman in football, basketball, and track and field.  In football, he was named the East Texas Lineman of the Year as a senior.  In basketball, he was an All-Distinct honoree. He has a daughter, Tiana, who  attends University of Arkansas and a son, Brandon, who attends Rutgers University. He is known for being one of the kindest men in the NFL.

College career
Williams started at tackle for the last 25 games of his career at the University of Arkansas.  As a senior, Williams earned second-team All-Southeastern Conference honors, playing on a line that led the SEC in fewest sacks allowed (14), while helping the offense amass 4067 total yards. Williams also helped the Arkansas Razorbacks beat the Texas Longhorns 27-6 in the 2000 Cotton Bowl Classic.

Williams majored in vocational training.

Professional career

Philadelphia Eagles
Williams was drafted by the Philadelphia Eagles in the second round (61st overall) in the 2000 NFL Draft. He was inactive throughout the entire 2000 season as he made the transition from tackle to guard. He made his NFL debut at the Tampa Bay Buccaneers on January 6, 2001 starting at right guard. Williams played in every game for the Eagles in 2002 and 2003 and also played in two playoff games in 2002. He took over the starting right guard job after an elbow injury to Jermane Mayberry in 2003.
During his four years with Philadelphia, Williams helped the Eagles win three NFC East Division titles in a row (2001-2003), reaching the NFC Championship Game (2001-2003) during that three year run.

Cincinnati Bengals
On March 26, 2004, Williams signed with the Cincinnati Bengals as an unrestricted free agent.  He was the only player both on offense to play every snap on his unit. In 2005, Williams was part of the offensive line which only allowed 21 sacks which beat the previous franchise record of 24 sacks set in the 1972–73 season. He was re-signed to a two-year contract on April 5, 2010. In Week 14 of the 2011 NFL season, Williams broke his ankle in a 20–19 loss against the Houston Texans, causing him to miss the remainder of the season.
During his time in Cincinnati, Williams helped the Bengals win two AFC North Division titles (2005, 2009).

Baltimore Ravens
On June 8, 2012 Williams signed a two-year contract with the Baltimore Ravens. He won his first career Super Bowl on February 3, 2013 when the Ravens defeated the San Francisco 49ers by a score of 34-31 in Super Bowl XLVII. He was a backup most of the season and started six games.

On March 8, 2013, Williams was released by the Ravens.

References

External links
Baltimore Ravens bio

1976 births
Living people
American football offensive guards
Arkansas Razorbacks football players
Philadelphia Eagles players
Cincinnati Bengals players
Baltimore Ravens players
People from Jefferson, Texas
Players of American football from Texas
Ed Block Courage Award recipients